Nagendra Prasad Rijal (20 April 1927 – 23 September 1994) was the Prime Minister of Nepal from July 16, 1973, to December 1, 1975, and from March 21, 1986, to June 18, 1986. He served also as the speaker of Rastriya Panchayat. He was born in Chungmang, Nepal, in Dhankuta District of Nepal.

His life was short and simple giving birth to a new and great politician. Himself who sorted out Nepal until death.

References

1927 births
1994 deaths
People from Dhankuta District
Prasad Rijal, Nagendra
Nepalese Hindus
Banaras Hindu University alumni
Members of the Rastriya Panchayat
20th-century prime ministers of Nepal
Members of the National Assembly (Nepal)